Amelia of Württemberg (28 June 179928 November 1848) was a Duchess of Württemberg and an ancestor of the British, Greek, Romanian, Yugoslavian and Spanish Royal Families.

She was a daughter of Duke Louis of Württemberg and Princess Henrietta of Nassau-Weilburg. She was tutored by her governess, the known memoirist Alexandrine des Écherolles, who described her pupils in her memoirs.

Marriage and children
She married Joseph, Duke of Saxe-Altenburg (1789–1868), on 24 April 1817, at Kirchheim unter Teck.

Amalie and Joseph had six daughters:
 Princess Alexandrine Marie Wilhelmine Katharine Charlotte Therese Henriette Luise Pauline Elisabeth Friederike Georgine of Saxe-Altenburg (14 April 1818, Hildburghausen9 January 1907, Gmunden); married on 18 February 1843 to King George V of Hanover.
 Princess Pauline Friederike Henriette Auguste of Saxe-Altenburg (24 November 1819, Kirchheim unter Teck11 January 1825, Hildburghausen)
 Princess Henriette Friederike Therese Elisabeth of Saxe-Altenburg (9 October 1823, Hildburghausen3 April 1915, Altenburg)
 Princess Elisabeth Pauline Alexandrine of Saxe-Altenburg (26 March 1826, Hildburghausen2 February 1896, Oldenburg); married on 10 February 1852 to Peter II, Grand Duke of Oldenburg.
 Princess Alexandra Friederike Henriette Pauline Marianne Elisabeth of Saxe-Altenburg (8 July 1830, Altenburg6 July 1911, St. Petersburg); married on 11 September 1848 to Grand Duke Konstantin Nikolayevich of Russia. Upon her marriage, she took the name Alexandra Iosifovna in a Russian Orthodox baptism.
 Princess Luise of Saxe-Altenburg (4 June 1832, Altenburg29 August 1833, Hummelshain)

Amalia died on 28 November 1848 at the age of 49 in Altenburg. Her husband decided two days later to abdicate in the favor of his brother George, Duke of Saxe-Altenburg. Joseph died in 1868 at Altenburg.

Ancestry

|-

References

1799 births
1848 deaths
People from Kłodzko County
People from the Province of Silesia
Duchesses of Württemberg
House of Saxe-Altenburg
Duchesses of Saxe-Altenburg